The 1914 United States Senate election in South Dakota took place on November 3, 1914. Incumbent Senator Coe I. Crawford, a Republican, sought re-election in his first popular election. He was defeated in the Republican primary by Congressman Charles H. Burke, the House Minority Whip. In the general election, he was narrowly defeated by Edwin S. Johnson, the 1912 Democratic nominee for Governor, who won a narrow plurality.

Democratic Primary

Candidates
 Edwin S. Johnson, former State Senator, 1912 Democratic nominee for Governor

Results

Republican Primary

Candidates
 Charles H. Burke, U.S. Congressman from South Dakota's 2nd congressional district
 Coe I. Crawford, incumbent U.S. Senator

Results

Socialist Primary

Candidates
 E. P. Johnson

Results

Prohibition Primary

Candidates
 O. W. Butterfield

Results

General election

Results

References

South Dakota
1914
1914 South Dakota elections